This is a list of all aircraft (fixed-wing and rotary-wing) operated by the Argentine Army Aviation command since its formation in 1956. For the current inventory please refer to the main article. Prototypes and aircraft evaluated but not used operationally are excluded.

Fixed-wing aircraft

Rotary-wing aircraft

See also 

 Argentine Army Aviation
 Argentine air forces in the Falklands War
 List of aircraft of the Argentine Air Force
 List of aircraft of the Argentine Naval Aviation

Footnotes

References

Notes

Bibliography 
 Andrade, John. Militair 1982. London: Aviation Press Limited, 1982. .
 Smith, Gordon. Battle Atlas of the Falklands War 1982. Naval-History.net, 2006. .

Online sources

Further reading 
Books
 
 
 
 
 

Online articles

External links 
 Argentine Army official site
 

Argentina Army Aviation
Army Aviation
Aviation in Argentina
Argentine Army Aviation
aircraft of the Argentine Army
Military equipment of Argentina